T2S (TARGET2-Securities) is a European securities settlement engine which aims to offer centralised delivery-versus-payment (DvP) settlement in central bank funds across all European securities markets. It is important to take note of the fact that T2S is not a central securities depository (CSD), but a platform intended to enable CSDs to increase their competitiveness.

After market consultations and a decision by the Governing Council of the European Central Bank (ECB), the project was launched in 2008 and the platform started operations in 2015. The T2S Framework Agreement, negotiated between CSDs and the Eurosystem, has been signed by 24 CSDs, which migrated to the T2S platform in four waves between June 2015 and February 2017.

The fundamental objective of the T2S project is to integrate and harmonise the highly fragmented securities settlement infrastructure in Europe. It aims to reduce the costs of cross-border securities settlement and to increase competition and choice amongst providers of post-trading services in Europe. Therefore it is a critical step forward in the creation of the single market for financial services in the European Union.

The development and operation of T2S was assigned to four central banks of the Eurosystem—those of France, Germany, Italy, and Spain. The project is being coordinated by the ECB. The IT platform will be owned and operated by the Eurosystem. Technical details of the project are available at the ECB T2S project website.

Objective and benefits

One of the objectives of T2S is to reduce the cost of securities settlement in Europe, in particular for transactions across EU countries, which can be ten times more expensive than domestic transactions. In addition, banks are able to optimise their collateral (finance) and liquidity management. The T2S settlement platform is also a step towards a single market for financial services. The T2S project was intended as a catalyst for further harmonisation of post-trade practices and regulations across Europe. Significant progress has already been made by the T2S governance bodies, composed of industry experts, on harmonisation of instructions management and settlement processes, as well as on the processing of corporate actions on unsettled transactions. 

As a result of reduced settlement costs, increased competition, and greater harmonisation, T2S is expected to have a positive impact on European economic growth. The lower costs of settlement, and potentially the costs for other post-trade services, are expected to be passed on to investors. Furthermore, by making it easier and less costly to access securities in other EU countries, investors could benefit from more diversified bond and equity portfolios. In addition, issuers will gain access to a more diversified investor base.

The T2S platform is supposed to also have a positive impact on financial stability. In particular, it helps to reduce the risks that still affect the settlement of cross-border transactions. With its robust business continuity solution, it also decreases counterparty and settlement agent risk.
Additionally, by fostering greater efficiency and integration of European financial markets, T2S may lead to greater diversification and sharing of risks, adding to the stability of the whole system. Due to the lean T2S concept and the resulting facilitation of post-trade activities, banks are able to streamline their back offices and thus produce cost savings. As T2S separates the settlement infrastructure from the services offered by CSDs, competition in the provision of these services may increase and benefit the customers Europe-wide.

Origin

Historically, financial market infrastructures in Europe were created to meet the requirements of national financial markets. In most cases, there were one or two dominant players at each stage of the value chain: typically one stock exchange for trading, one central counterparty (CCP) for clearing and at least one CSD for settlement. Furthermore, these national infrastructures were primarily designed to manage securities denominated in the national currency. Securities settlement across Europe thus remained costly and cumbersome.

Despite the introduction of the euro more than ten years ago, the provision of post-trading services (i.e., clearing and settlement) remained heavily fragmented along national lines. For example, there were still 19 CSDs operating in the euro area in 2009 and almost 40 in the 27 countries of the EU.
This situation is clearly not optimal for a single currency area or for the EU, as it encourages each country's financial market to remain domestically oriented. Investors continue to invest mostly in domestic securities, and as a result, the euro-area financial market cannot fully benefit from the risk diversification and competition benefits that arise from having a single currency. These barriers which provoke a considerable competitive disadvantage for European capital markets were identified in a report by the Giovannini Group. 
 
EU authorities have taken up initiatives to remove impediments to competition between national markets. The most important initiatives from the European Commission are the Markets in Financial Instruments Directive (MiFID), the European Market Infrastructure Regulation (EMIR) and the Central Securities Depositories Regulation (CSDR). T2S as a pan-European platform is intended to complement these existing initiatives by boosting competition, increasing price transparency, and harmonising practices across Europe.

Operations

Outage
In October, 2020, T2S and the associated ECB payments system TARGET2 experienced an almost-11-hour outage. Not long before Euronext NV, a stock market on the continent, also experienced some outages.

See also  
 Clearing (finance)
 European Central Bank
 Issuer
 Settlement (finance)
 TARGET2

References

External links 
 T2S page on the ECB website
 "T2S Framework Agreement. European Central Bank. 2011. Retrieved 24 June 2014.

Sources 
"New European Rules to Regulate Settlement and Central Securities Depositories (CSDR)"
History of the T2S Project
Fourth T2S Harmonisation Progress Report. European Central Bank. 19 March 2014. Retrieved 2 June 2014.
Financial Integration in Europe. European Central Bank. April 2014. Retrieved 2 June 2014.
T2S Benefits: Much More Than Fee Reductions. Ben Weller, European Central Bank. June 2012. Retrieved 17 June 2014.
Second Report on EU Clearing and Settlement Arrangements. The Giovannini Group. Brussels, April 2003. Retrieved 3 June 2014.
Payments, Securities and Derivatives, and the Role of the Eurosystem. European Central Bank. 2010. Retrieved 3 June 2014.

Banking
European Union financial market policy
Securities (finance)
Stock market